This is a list of Civic Sheriffs and High Sheriffs of the County of the City of Bristol, England.

The office of High Sheriff is over 1000 years old, with its establishment before the Norman Conquest. The High Sheriff remained first in precedence in the counties until the reign of Edward VII when an Order in Council in 1908 gave the Lord-Lieutenant the prime office under the Crown as the Sovereign's personal representative. The High Sheriff remains the Sovereign's representative in the County for all matters relating to the judiciary and the maintenance of law and order.

Bristol is unusual in having had county corporate status since medieval times (1373). The Lord Mayor and one or sometimes two sheriffs served as part of its civic governance. The county was expanded to include suburbs such as Clifton in 1835, and it was named a county borough in 1889, when the term was first introduced. However, on 1 April 1974 it became a part of the local government county of Avon. On 1 April 1996 Avon was abolished, allowing Bristol to regain its independence and county status and became a unitary authority with the royal appointments of Lord-Lieutenant and High Sheriff.

Civic (not High) Sheriff Office holders

14th & 15th century
Sheriffs of Bristol typically took office at the end of September and served until September of the following year

16th century

17th century

18th century

19th century

20th century

High Sheriffs for the County of City of Bristol

20th century
1996–1997: George Robin Paget Ferguson of Clifton
1997–1998: Richard Appleby Lalonde of Clifton
1998–1999: Edwin Howard Webber of Sneyd Park
1999–2000: John Richard Pool of Clifton

21st century
{{columns-list|colwidth=30em|
2000–2001: Dr Charles St. John Hartnell of Cameley, Bath & NE Somerset
2001–2002: Dr Malcolm Joseph Campbell of Sneyd Park
2002–2003: John Christopher Savage CBE of Clifton
2003–2004: Helen Mary Thornhill of Clifton
2004–2005: Valerie, Lady Kingman of Clifton
2005–2006: Roger Neale Baird of Sneyd Park
2006–2007: Richard Alan Lee of Redland
2007–2008: William Howard Robert Durie of Abbots Leigh, N Somerset
2008–2009: Professor Richard Hodder-Williams of Clifton
2009–2010: Timothy Lachlan Chambers OBE JP of Redland
2010–2011: Lois Patricia (Peaches) Golding OBE of Leigh Woods, N Somerset
2011–2012: Dr John Cottrell of Redland
2012–2013: Andrew Nisbet of Clifton
2013–2014: Dr Shaheen Shahzadi Chaudhry JP of Whitchurch
 2014-2015: Henry Louis Michael Bothamley of Leigh Woods, N Somerset
 2015-2016: Dr Rosalind Penelope Kennedy of Clifton
 2016-2017: Helen Mary Wilde of Redland
 2017-2018: Anthony Roger Ernest Brown of Clifton
 2018-2019: Roger Gordon Opie of Clifton
 2019-2020: Charles John Calcraft Wyld of Clifton
 2020-2021: Dr John Cyril Manley of Clifton
 2021-2022: Mrs Susan Joan Davies BEM of Knowle
 2022-2023: Ms Alexandra Olivia Ardalan Raikes MBE of Bristol

In nomination as prospective High Sheriffs:

 Miss Sharon Rosemarie Foster of Horfield
 The Rev Richard Norman Pendlebury MBE DL of Bishopston
 Mrs Kalpna Kumari Woolf of Sneyd Park

References
 Mayors and Sheriffs of Bristol 1500–1599
  Mayors and Sheriffs of Bristol 1600–1699
 Mayors and Sheriffs of Bristol 1700–1799
 Mayors and Sheriffs of Bristol 1800–1899
 Mayors and Sheriffs of Bristol 1900–2000

External links
Official website of the High Sheriff of Bristol

Bristol
Local government in Bristol
 
High Sheriff